is a Japanese musician and composer. He is known for his music in several anime and tokusatsu shows, as well as video games, films and dorama. His compositions for the Fuji TV series Tales of the Unusual are his most famous work, though he also composed the soundtrack for Metroid: Other M for the Wii, for which he is known abroad.

Works

Anime

Live action

Video games

References

External links
  
 Interview at RocketBaby
 
 

Year of birth missing (living people)
Anime composers
Japanese film score composers
Japanese male composers
Japanese male film score composers
Japanese male musicians
Living people
Musicians from Saitama Prefecture
Video game composers